The Graduate School of Management (also known as GSOM SPbU) is the business school of Saint Petersburg State University. GSOM offers undergraduate, graduate, and postgraduate programs taught in English and Russian. It is consistently ranked among the top business schools in Europe. GSOM's Master in Management degree is the only MiM program in Russia ranked by the Financial Times and The Economist.

History 
 4 November 1992: The university signs a cooperation agreement with Haas School of Business
 1 September 1993: The School starts teaching. It counts six professors and 33 bachelor students. The first dean is elected Prof. Yu. V. Pashkus. The School is supervised by an International Advisory Board chaired by John E. Pepper, Jr., CEO, Procter & Gamble.
 1999: The Faculty greets its first 19 Masters and opens an English-speaking ECTS-compliant program, Master of International Business, in cooperation with four Nordic business schools.
 2004: The Faculty creates its R&D institute, signs an agreement with four European business schools to create an International Executive MBA (IEMBA) program, and joins AACSB.
 2005: Most programs have transferred to the Bologna model, the Faculty starts offering Doktor Nauk's degree.
 2006: The Faculty joins CEMS and EFMD and launches an Executive MBA (EMBA) program. President Vladimir Putin lays a cornerstone into the foundation of the school's new campus in Mikhailovka, a former royal estate in Petergof.
 2008: GSOM SPbU launches corporate education programs in cooperation with Fuqua School of Business, joins PIM, and gets accredited by AMBA (Executive MBA) and EPAS (Bachelor's).
 2009: GSOM SPbU joins GMAC and launches a Dual-Degree Executive MBA program in cooperation with HEC Paris.
 2021: GSOM SPbU received AASCB accreditation and since that it has Triple accredetation.

Programs 
 Bachelor's degree:
 International Management
 Management
 Public Management
 Master's degree:
 Master in Management (MiM)
 Master in Business Analytics and Big Data (MiBA)
 Master in Corporate Finance (MCF)
 Smart City Management (SCM)
 Master's dual-degree:
 within the MiM, MiBA, MCF programs
 CEMS Master in International Management (CEMS MiM)
 HEC-Paris
 School of Business, Lappeenranta University of Technology, Kozminski University
 Executive Education:
 Executive MBA
 Dual-Degree Executive MBA in English
 Executive MBA in Russian
 Corporate Education
 Open Programs
 Professional Development Programs
 Candidate's and Doctor's degrees

Faculty and structure

Director 
The Director of the Graduate School of Management St. Petersburg University is Olga Dergunova, Deputy President and Chairman of the VTB Bank Management Board.

Advisory board 
GSOM is supervised by the Advisory Board chaired by Deputy Prime Minister Sergei Ivanov.

Faculty and students 
GSOM employs 89 full-time faculty members and over a lot of professors from other faculties of the university and international business schools, as well as leading management practitioners.

Premises and facilities 

GSOM is headquartered in the Arthur B. Schultz building at 1-3 Volkhovsky Pereulok on Vasilievsky Island, which houses the administration, library, publishing house, and post-graduate programs. In 2006, the school was granted Grand Duke Mikhail Romanov's former summer estate in Petergof to redevelop it and create a suburban campus. The Mikhailovskaya Dacha campus was opened in 2015 and houses all undergraduate programs.

Rankings and accreditations

In 2012 GSOM obtained institutional accreditation EQUIS (European Quality Improvement System). The quality of educational programs is approved by program accreditations: AMBA (Executive МВА) and EPAS (Bachelor).

GSOM SPbU is a member of global associations of the leading business schools: EFMD, AACSB, CEMS, PIM, EABIS, GBSN, GRLI.
 
According to EdUniversal ranking since 2008 GSOM SPbU is the first among Russian business schools, and in 2013 EdUniversal agreed for the second time that GSOM SPbU is the best among business schools of Eastern Europe. The Izvestia newspaper ranking (2011, 2012, 2013), based on interviews with MBA graduates, named GSOM as the first among Russian business schools. In 2021, GSOM SPbU received AASCB accreditation and now has the Triple Crown.

See also 
 Saint Petersburg State University

References

External links 
 Official Website of the Graduate School of Management, St. Petersburg University
 Official Website of St. Petersburg State University

Saint Petersburg State University
Educational institutions established in 2007
Business schools in Russia
2007 establishments in Russia